Eslamabad-e Bezahrud (also Romanized as Eslāmābād-e Bezahrūd; also known as Bazrūd, Bezarūd, Bozeh Rūd, Boz Rūd, and Buzrud) is a village in Kanduleh Rural District, Dinavar District, Sahneh County, Kermanshah Province, Iran. At the 2006 census, its population was 92, in 24 families.

References 

Populated places in Sahneh County